Curtright may refer to:
 Thomas Curtright (born 1948), an American theoretical physicist
 Curtright field, a theoretical physics concept 
 Curtright, Texas, an unincorporated community in Cass County, Texas

See also
 Cartwright (disambiguation)